Eastern Air Lines Flight 45 was a domestic commercial airline flight that had a mid-air collision with a USAAF A-26 Invader bomber over northeastern South Carolina on July 12, 1945, forcing an emergency landing in a field by the airliner, and resulting in the crash of the bomber. One airline passenger and two bomber crewmen were killed.

On July 12, 1945, a US Army Air Forces A-26C-35-DT Invader, 44-35553, on a training flight out of Florence Army Air Field, had a mid-air collision with Eastern Air Lines Flight 45 from Washington, D.C. to Columbia, S.C., a DC-3-201C, NC25647, c/n 2235, at ~3100 feet, 11.9 miles WNW of Florence, South Carolina over the community of Lamar, South Carolina, at 1436 hrs. The A-26 vertical fin struck the port wing of the airliner, displacing the engine of the DC-3, which then cut into the fuselage. The A-26 tail sheared off and two of the crew parachuted but only one survived. The crew of the bomber who died were Cpl. Robert B. Clapp and Cpl. Raleigh B. Allbaugh Jr., both of Oklahoma City, Oklahoma. The surviving crew member's name was not released due to wartime censorship. The DC-3 pilot belly-landed in a cornfield after a 20-to-30-second descent. Only one passenger of the 20 total on board was killed: a two-year-old boy who suffered head injuries. He died while being transported to a hospital in Florence, South Carolina. His mother and two other persons were reported to be very seriously injured and were also taken to the Florence hospital.

According to "The State" newspaper on July 13, 1945 (page 1) the public relations office of the Florence Army Air Field last night issued the following statement:

References

External links
 Final report by the Civil Aeronautics Board (PDF)

Mid-air collisions
Mid-air collisions involving airliners
Mid-air collisions involving military aircraft
Airliner accidents and incidents in South Carolina
Accidents and incidents involving the Douglas DC-3
Accidents and incidents involving United States Air Force aircraft
45
Aviation accidents and incidents in the United States in 1945
Darlington County, South Carolina
Disasters in South Carolina
1945 in South Carolina
July 1945 events in the United States